Enneapterygius clarkae, the barred triplefin, is a species of threefin blenny in the genus Enneapterygius. It was described by Wouter Holleman in 1982, and was given its species epithet in honour of American ichthyologist Eugenie Clark (1922-2015)  It is a tropical blenny known from the Indian Ocean, and has been described from the Red Sea to Natal, South Africa. Male barred triplefins can reach a maximum length of 2.5 centimetres.

References

External links
 Enneapterygius clarkae at Encyclopedia of Life
 Enneapterygius clarkae at World Register of Marine Species

clarkae
Fish of the Red Sea
Taxa named by Wouter Holleman
Fish described in 1982